Sharing Your Love is the third studio album by the Italian/U.S. ensemble Change. It was released in 1982 and reached number sixty-six on the US Billboard Album Chart and fourteen on the US Billboard Black Albums chart. Sharing Your Love includes the singles "The Very Best in You", "Oh What a Night", "Sharing Your Love", "Hard Times (It's Gonna Be Alright)" and "Keep On It" (in Italy only).

The band recorded the songs for album at Mediasound Studios, New York City. The sessions were then mastered at Sterling Sound Studios. Receiving mixed to positive reviews the album was originally released as an LP in April 1982. The artwork was designed by Greg Porto.

Reception

Sharing Your Love received mixed to positive reviews by the majority of critics.

Track listing

Personnel
 Jacques Fred Petrus - Producer
 Mauro Malavasi - Producer
 Jack Skinner - Engineering

Recorded at Mediasound Studios, NY. Mastered at Sterling Sound, NY.

Change 
 James "Crab" Robinson - lead vocals
 Deborah Cooper - lead vocals
 Timmy Allen - bass
 Mike Campbell - guitar
 Vincent Henry - guitar, saxophone
 Jeff Bova - keyboards
 Rick Galwey - percussion

Charts

References

1982 albums
Change (band) albums
Atlantic Records albums